Mississippi River State Fish and Wildlife Area is an  protected area in Jersey and Calhoun Counties, Illinois. The park is maintained by the Illinois Department of Natural Resources.

References

State parks of Illinois
Protected areas of Calhoun County, Illinois
Protected areas of Jersey County, Illinois
Protected areas on the Mississippi River